Haishan station can refer to:
Haishan metro station, a metro station in Taipei, Taiwan
Haishan station (Shenzhen Metro), a metro station in Shenzhen, China